Alan Parkinson (5 May 1932 – 2002) was an English footballer.

He played for Bradford Park Avenue and Scarborough.

Notes

1932 births
2002 deaths
English footballers
Association football forwards
Bradford (Park Avenue) A.F.C. players
Scarborough F.C. players
English Football League players